The Stockholm municipal election of 1979 was held on 16 September 1979 concurrently with the 1979 Swedish parliamentary election.  This election used a party-list proportional representation system to allocate the 101 seats of the Stockholm City Council (Stockholms stadsfullmäktige) amongst the various Swedish political parties.  Voter turnout was 86.4%.

The Stockholm Party was founded in this year, and was allocated three seats in this election, marking the first time a party entered or exited the Stockholm City Council since the Centre Party earned their first mandate in 1966.

Results

See also
 Elections in Sweden
 List of political parties in Sweden
 City of Stockholm

Notes

References
Statistics Sweden, "Kommunfullmäktigval - valresultat" (Swedish) 
Statistics Sweden, "Kommunfullmäktigval - erhållna mandat efter kommun och parti. Valår 1973–2006" (Swedish) 

Municipal elections in Stockholm
1979 elections in Sweden
1970s in Stockholm
September 1979 events in Europe